Phrynobatrachus ogoensis (also known as the Ogowe  river frog) is a species of frog in the family Phrynobatrachidae. It is endemic to Gabon and is known from its type locality, Lambaréné in the Moyen-Ogooué Province, and from the Ramba Village in the Ogooué-Ivindo Province, in the buffer zone of the Lopé National Park.

Description
The type specimen measures  in snout–vent length. The snout is obtusely pointed. The tympanum is not visible. The finger tips are feebly dilated. The toes are nearly half-webbed, with the webbing extending as a fringe on the sides to the tips; the toe tips are dilated into small but distinct discs. Dorsal skin is smooth or has small warts. A fold runs from the eye to the shoulder. The dorsum is brown and bears indistinct darker markings. The limbs have darker cross-bands. A light vertebral stripe may be present. The lips have large dark brown spots. The venter is white. The throat is dark brown in males and may be spotted with brown in females. Males have a subgular vocal sac.

Habitat and conservation
Ecology of this species is poorly known.

Threats to Phrynobatrachus ogoensis are not known. It is quite possible that it occurs the Lopé National Park.

References

ogoensis
Frogs of Africa
Amphibians of Gabon
Endemic fauna of Gabon
Taxa named by George Albert Boulenger
Amphibians described in 1906
Taxonomy articles created by Polbot